Icarus is a genus of ferns in the family Blechnaceae, subfamily Blechnoideae, with a single species Icarus filiformis, according to the Pteridophyte Phylogeny Group classification of 2016 (PPG I). The genus is accepted in a 2016 classification of the family Blechnaceae, but other sources sink it into a very broadly defined Blechnum, equivalent to the whole of the PPG I subfamily.

Icarus filiformis, synonym Blechnum filiforme, is known as thread fern or pānoko in Māori. It is endemic to New Zealand. It has a creeping and climbing habit. It has three different types of fronds: long climbing fronds with long pointed leaves, shorter creeping fronds with nearly round leaves, and fertile fronds with threadlike leaves that give the species its common name.

References

Blechnaceae